Uhland is a city in Caldwell and Hays counties in the U.S. state of Texas. The population was 1,588 at the 2020 census, up from 1,014 at the 2010 census. Uhland is named after the German poet Ludwig Uhland.

Geography

Uhland is located in eastern Hays County and northwestern Caldwell County at  (29.963870, –97.794875). Texas State Highway 21 is the main road through town, leading southwest  to San Marcos and northeast  to Bastrop.

Demographics

As of the 2020 United States census, there were 1,588 people, 406 households, and 352 families residing in the city.

As of the census of 2000, there were 386 people, 134 households, and 92 families residing in the city. The population density was 211.3 people per square mile (81.4/km). There were 143 housing units at an average density of 78.3 per square mile (30.2/km). The racial makeup of the city was 73.06% White, 0.78% African American, 0.52% Asian, 23.83% from other races, and 1.81% from two or more races. Hispanic or Latino of any race were 51.30% of the population.

There were 134 households, out of which 41.8% had children under the age of 18 living with them, 54.5% were married couples living together, 11.2% had a female householder with no husband present, and 30.6% were non-families. 23.9% of all households were made up of individuals, and 7.5% had someone living alone who was 65 years of age or older. The average household size was 2.88 and the average family size was 3.42.

In the city, the population was spread out, with 32.9% under the age of 18, 11.4% from 18 to 24, 30.1% from 25 to 44, 17.4% from 45 to 64, and 8.3% who were 65 years of age or older. The median age was 28 years. For every 100 females, there were 90.1 males. For every 100 females age 18 and over, there were 86.3 males.

The median income for a household in the city was $30,714, and the median income for a family was $31,875. Males had a median income of $24,750 versus $22,813 for females. The per capita income for the city was $13,593. About 7.1% of families and 11.4% of the population were below the poverty line, including 12.1% of those under age 18 and 13.2% of those age 65 or over.

Education
The City of Uhland is served by the Hays Consolidated Independent School District.

External links
 City of Uhland official website

References

Cities in Caldwell County, Texas
Cities in Hays County, Texas
Cities in Texas
Cities in Greater Austin